Mbonga may be,

Mboa language
Mamute Mbonga